Zuckerkandl! is a comic book published in 1968.  It was written by Robert Maynard Hutchins and illustrated by John Hubley.  The book profiles the philosophy of the fictitious Austrian thinker Dr. Alexander Zuckerkandl and satirizes his philosophy of disentanglement. Resembling a fairy tale in form, Zuckerkandl! has been interpreted as a parody of Freud, though it explicitly contrasts the philosophy of Freud (requiring the plumbing of the unconscious by the conscious) with the philosophy of Zuckerkandl (replacing conscious thought altogether by living habitually). As such, it blames Zuckerkandl (and by extension, according to some critics, Freud) for the ills of modern society.  The comic book also has an animated film version, directed by John Hubley.

References

External links

 Zuckerkandl! at Google Books
 Discussion on Metafilter
 Discussion at Michael Sporn Animation

1968 comics debuts
American comics adapted into films
Fictional philosophies
Fictional Austrian people
Comics characters introduced in 1968
Satirical comics
Cultural depictions of Sigmund Freud